AtlantiCare is a health system based in Atlantic County, serving southeastern New Jersey. An integrated system of services, it includes AtlantiCare Regional Medical Center, the AtlantiCare Foundation, AtlantiCare Physician Group and AtlantiCare Health Solutions, an accountable care organization. AtlantiCare also offers Atlantic City's only cancer institute, heart institute, and neonatal intensive care unit.

Organization
AtlantiCare employs more than 5,000 staff members and 600 physicians in nearly 70 locations.

The AtlantiCare Regional Medical Center consists of two hospitals:
AtlantiCare Regional Medical Center, Atlantic City Campus in Atlantic City, NJ
AtlantiCare Regional Medical Center Mainland Division in Pomona, NJ

The Mainland Campus, located on West Jimmie Leeds Road, opened in 1975. In 2005, AtlantiCare started a $35 million expansion project that included a new emergency department and the Roger B. Hansen Center for Childbirth. In 2009, the Mainland campus opened a $20 million Cardiac Catheterization & Rhythm Center. Recognizing that it serves as a resource of critical community infrastructure, when AtlantiCare expanded the hospital in 2007, it took protective measures by building Harmony Pavilion to withstand a category 3 hurricane.

In 2014, The Children's Hospital of Philadelphia (CHOP) and AtlantiCare announced a partnership. CHOP Newborn & Pediatric Care at AtlantiCare delivers tertiary pediatric and subspecialist support to southeastern New Jersey. CHOP pediatric hospitalists are at the Stanley M. Grossman Pediatric Center at AtlantiCare Regional Medical Center Atlantic City Campus. CHOP neonatologists are at the Neonatal Intensive Care Unit at the Roger B. Hansen Center for Childbirth at AtlantiCare Regional Medical Center Mainland Campus. CHOP clinicians also consult with emergency teams at both AtlantiCare hospitals.

In 2016, Lori Herndon replaced David Tilton as president and CEO of the company. She is the current President of AtlantiCare.

Awards and accreditations 
 Malcolm Baldrige National Quality Award, 2009
 Magnet hospital status, designated 2004, re-designated 2008
 Residency program accredited by Accreditation Council for Graduate Medical Education
 Residency program accredited by American Osteopathic Association

See also
 List of hospitals in New Jersey

References

External links

Atlantic County, New Jersey
Healthcare in New Jersey
Hospital networks in the United States
1898 establishments in New Jersey
Medical and health organizations based in New Jersey